The 2020–21 Ghana Premier League is the 65th season of top professional association football league in Ghana. The season started on 14 November 2020. 18 teams are competing in the league with each club playing each other twice, home and away, with the three clubs at the bottom of the league relegated to the Division One League.

Season overview 
With 18 clubs participating in the league, this marked the second time since 1980 that more than 16 clubs competed in the top division of Ghanaian football. The GFA announced that the league was suspended on 15 March 2020, in the middle of match-week 15, because of the global COVID-19 pandemic. On 31 May, the league was further suspended until at least 31 June. On 30 June, the FA had a meeting and cancelled the league due to the COVID-19 pandemic. A meeting was held on 27 August 2020 to determine the start and logistics of the 2020–21 season.

The Ghana Football Association (GFA), on Friday, 5 November 2020 launched the 65th Ghana Premier League season and other products of the Association, ie, Division One League, Women's Premier League and the MTN FA Cup. The launch took place in the studio of Broadcast partner, StarTimes and broadcast live on StarTimes Adepa Channel 247 and Max TV.

Due to the COVID-19 pandemic on 22 October 2020, The Ghana Football Association (GFA) began testing of players, coaching staff, and officials of the 18 Premier League clubs.

The Ghana Football Association Chairman announced that the prize money for winning the league; "The winner of the 2020/21 Premier League will earn GHC 250,000 in prize money. The prize money is an increase from the GHc 180,000 received by the last winner of the Ghana Premier League Aduana Stars in the 2016/17 season."

Prize money 
 The club that places first in the league season would earn a trophy along with a cash prize of GHC 250,000, 40 gold medals and Ghc 10,000 worth of groceries from Melcom Shopping Center.
 The club that places second in the league season would receive GHC 150,000 and 40 silver medals and groceries from Melcom Shopping Center.
 The club that places third in the league season would earn an amount of GHC 80,000 and 40 bronze medals.

Challenges

COVID-19 
The opening game between Hearts of Oak and Aduana Stars was postponed after a number of players tested positive for COVID-19. 16 teams went for COVID-19 testing.

The game between Liberty Professionals and Bechem United was also postponed due to the COVID-19 pandemic.

Teams 
The 2020-2021 Ghana Premier League season has seen an increase in the number of clubs from 16 to 18 clubs. The Accra Sports Stadium would be home to five Premier League Clubs, they are Hearts of Oak, Asante Kotoko, Legon Cities , Great Olympics and Inter Allies.

Stadiums and locations 
Note: Table lists in alphabetical order.

Club managers and captains 
The table lists club managers.

Managerial changes

League table 

Ebusua Dwarfs were relegated based on head-to-head disadvantage against Elmina Sharks and King Faisal not goal difference.

Season statistics

Scoring

Top scorers

Hat-tricks

Most assists

Clean sheets

Awards

Monthly awards 
As of 29 July 2021

Annual awards

See also 

 2020–21 Ghana Women's Premier League
 Ghana Premier League
2021 Ghanaian FA Cup

References

External links 

 Official Website

 2020–21 Ghana Premier League at RSSF
2020–21 Ghana Premier League at Soccerway

Ghana Premier League seasons
2020–21 in African association football leagues
2020–21 in Ghanaian football